Matres lectionis (from Latin "mothers of reading", singular form: mater lectionis, from  ) are consonants that are used to indicate a vowel, primarily in the writing down of Semitic languages such as Arabic, Hebrew and Syriac. The letters that do this in Hebrew are aleph , he , waw  and yod , and in Arabic, the matres lectionis (though they are much less often referred to thus) are ʾalif , wāw  and yāʾ . The 'yod and waw in particular are more often vowels than they are consonants. 

The original value of the matres lectionis corresponds closely to what is called in modern linguistics glides or semivowels.

Overview
Because the scripts used to write some Semitic languages lack vowel letters, unambiguous reading of a text might be difficult.  Therefore, to indicate vowels (mostly long), consonant letters are used.  For example, in the Hebrew construct-state form bēt, meaning "the house of", the middle letter  in the spelling  acts as a vowel, but in the corresponding absolute-state form bayit ("house"), which is spelled the same, the same letter represents a genuine consonant.  Matres lectionis are extensively employed only in Hebrew, Aramaic, Syriac and Arabic, but the phenomenon is also found in the Ugaritic, Moabite, South Arabian and Phoenician alphabets.

Origins and development

This epiphenomenal association between consonant letters and vowel sounds was then seized upon and used in words without historic diphthongs.

In general terms, it is observable that early Phoenician texts have very few matres lectionis, and that during most of the 1st millennium BCE, Hebrew and Aramaic were quicker to develop matres lectionis than Phoenician. However, in its latest period of development in North Africa (referred to as "Punic"), Phoenician developed a very full use of matres lectionis, including the use of the letter ayin , also used for this purpose much later in Yiddish orthography.

In pre-exilic Hebrew, there was a significant development of the use of the letter he  to indicate word final vowels other than ī and ū. This was probably inspired by the phonological change of the third-person singular possessive suffix from  >  >  in most environments.

According to Sass (5), already in the Middle Kingdom there were some cases of matres lectionis, i.e. consonant graphemes which were used to transcribe vowels in foreign words, namely in Punic (Jensen 290, Naveh 62), Aramaic, and Hebrew (sometimes even aleph ; Naveh 62). Naveh (ibid.) notes that the earliest Aramaic and Hebrew documents already used matres lectionis. Some scholars argue that the Greeks must therefore have borrowed their alphabet from the Arameans. However, the practice has older roots, as the Semitic cuneiform alphabet of Ugarit (13th century BC) already had matres lectionis (Naveh 138).

Hebrew
The earliest method of indicating some vowels in Hebrew writing was to use the consonant letters yod , waw , he ,and aleph  of the Hebrew alphabet to also write long vowels in some cases.

If words can be written with or without matres lectionis, spellings that include the letters are called malē (Hebrew) or plene (Latin), meaning "full", and spellings without them are called ḥaser or defective. In some verb forms, matres lectionis are almost always used. Around the 9th century CE, it was decided that the system of matres lectionis did not suffice to indicate the vowels precisely enough for purposes of liturgical recitation of Biblical texts so a supplemental vowel pointing system (niqqud) (diacritic symbols indicating vowel pronunciation and other important phonological features not written by the traditional basic consonantal orthography) joined matres lectionis as part of the Hebrew writing system.

In some words in Hebrew, there is a choice of whether to use a mater lectionis or not, and in modern printed texts matres lectionis are sometimes used even for short vowels, which is considered to be grammatically incorrect according to traditional norms, though instances are found as far back as Talmudic times. Such texts from Judaea and Galilee were noticeably more inclined to malē spellings than texts from Babylonia. Similarly, in the Middle Ages, Ashkenazi Jews tended to use malē spellings under the influence of European languages, but Sephardi Jews tended to use ḥaser spellings under the influence of Arabic.

Arabic
In Arabic there is no such choice, and the almost invariable rule is that a long vowel is written with a mater lectionis and a short vowel with a diacritic symbol, but the Uthmanic orthography, the one in which the Quran is traditionally written and printed, has some differences, which are not always consistent. Also, under influence from orthography of European languages, transliterating of borrowed words into Arabic is usually done using matres lectionis in place of diacritics, even when the latter is more suitable or when words from another Semitic language, such as Hebrew, are transliterated. That phenomenon is augmented by the neglect of diacritics in most printed forms since the beginning of mechanical printing.

It is a formal orthography in other languages that use Arabic script, such as Kurdish alphabets.

Syriac
Syriac-Aramaic vowels are classified into three groups: the alap, the waw, and the yod.  The mater lectionis was developed as early as the 6th century to represent long vowels, which were earlier denoted by a dot under the line. The most frequent ones are the yod and the waw, while the alap is mostly restricted to some transliterated words.

Mandaic
In the Mandaic alphabet, vowels are usually written out in full. The first letter, a (corresponding to alaph), is used to represent a range of open vowels. The sixth letter, wa, is used for close back vowels (u and o), and the tenth letter, ya is used for close front vowels (i and e). These last two can also serve as the consonants w/v and y. The eighth letter corresponds to the Semitic heth, and is called eh; it is pronounced as a long i-vowel but is used only as a suffix for the third person singular. The sixteenth letter, e (Aramaic ayn), usually represents e at the beginning of a word or, when followed by wa or ya, represents initial u or i respectively.

Usage in Hebrew

Most commonly, yod  indicates i or e, while waw  indicates o or u. Aleph  was not systematically developed as a mater lectionis in Hebrew (unlike in Aramaic and Arabic), but it is occasionally used to indicate an a vowel. (However, a silent , indicating an original glottal stop consonant sound that has become silent in Hebrew pronunciation, can occur after almost any vowel.) At the end of a word, he  can also be used to indicate that a vowel a or e should be pronounced.

Examples:
{|class="wikitable"
|-
! rowspan=2 | Symbol
! colspan=2 |  Name
! rowspan=2 |  Vowel formation
! rowspan=2 |  Vowel quality
! colspan=2 |  Example
|-
! Biblical
! Modern
! Hebrew
! Transliteration
|-
| style="text-align: center; font-family:SBL Hebrew, Ezra SIL SR, Ezra SIL, Cardo, Chrysanthi Unicode, TITUS Cyberbit Basic, Arial Unicode MS, Narkisim, Times New Roman;font-size:200%" | 
| colspan=2 style="text-align: center;" | Alef
|  ê, ệ, ậ, â, ô
| mostly ā
| 
| Paran
|-
| style="text-align: center; font-family:SBL Hebrew, Ezra SIL SR, Ezra SIL, Cardo, Chrysanthi Unicode, TITUS Cyberbit Basic, Arial Unicode MS, Narkisim, Times New Roman;font-size:200%" rowspan=2 | 
| rowspan=2 colspan=2 style="text-align: center;"  | He
| rowspan=2 | ê, ệ, ậ, â, ô
| rowspan=2 |mostly ā or e
| 
| Leah
|-
| 
| Moshe
|-
| style="text-align: center; font-family:SBL Hebrew, Ezra SIL SR, Ezra SIL, Cardo, Chrysanthi Unicode, TITUS Cyberbit Basic, Arial Unicode MS, Narkisim, Times New Roman; font-size:200%" rowspan=2| 
| rowspan=2 style="text-align: center;" | Waw
| rowspan=2 style="text-align: center;" | Vav
| rowspan=2 |  ô, û
| rowspan=2 | ō or ū
| 
| Yo'el
|-
| 
| Baruch
|-
| style="text-align: center; font-family:SBL Hebrew, Ezra SIL SR, Ezra SIL, Cardo, Chrysanthi Unicode, TITUS Cyberbit Basic, Arial Unicode MS, Narkisim, Times New Roman;font-size:200%" | 
| style="text-align: center;" | Yod
|style="text-align: center;"  | Yud
|  î, ê, ệ
| ī, ē or ǣ
| 
| Amir
|}

Influence on other languages

Later, in some adaptations of the Arabic alphabet (such those sometimes used for Kurdish and Uyghur) and of the Hebrew alphabet (such as those used for Judeo-Arabic, Yiddish and Judaeo-Spanish), matres lectionis were generally used for all or most vowels, thus in effect becoming vowel letters: see Yiddish orthography. This tendency was taken to its logical conclusion in fully alphabetic scripts such as Greek, Latin, and Cyrillic. Many of the vowel letters in such languages historically go back to matres lectionis in the Phoenician script. For example, the letter  was originally derived from the consonant letter yod. Similarly the vowel letters in the Avestan alphabet were adapted from matres lectionis in the version of the Aramaic alphabet adapted as the Pahlavi scripts.

See also
 Hebrew spelling
 Ktiv hasar niqqud
 Mappiq
 Niqqud
 Tengwar
 Tiberian vocalization

Notes

Bibliography
 
 Canteins, Jean. 1972. Phonèmes et archétypes: contextes autour d'une structure trinitaire; AIU. Paris: G.-P. Maisonneuve et Larose.
 Garr, W. Randall. 1985.  Dialect Geography of Syria-Palestine, 1000-586 B.C.E.  Philadelphia: University of Pennsylvania Press.
 Jensen, Hans. 1970. Sign Symbol and Script. London: George Allen and Unwin Ltd. Transl. of Die Schrift in Vergangenheit und Gegenwart. VEB Deutscher Verlag der Wissenschaften. 1958, as revised by the author.
 Naveh, Joseph. 1979. Die Entstehung des Alphabets. Transl. of Origins of the Alphabet. Zürich und Köln. Benziger.
 Sass, Benjamin. 1991. Studia Alphabetica. On the origin and early history of the Northwest Semitic, South Semitic and Greek alphabets. CH-Freiburg: Universitätsverlag Freiburg Schweiz. Göttingen: Vandenhoeck & Ruprecht.

Arabic grammar
Arabic language
Arabic letters
Hebrew alphabet
Hebrew grammar
Semitic languages
Semitic linguistics
Semitic writing systems
Vowel letters